"Azúcar Amargo" is a Latin pop song sung by Mexican singer Fey. The song's title means "Bitter Sugar" in English, but is used in the context of the English term bittersweet. The song is about a relationship which brings her both joy and pain. The song was released in November 1996 as the first single from Fey's second album, Tierna la Noche, and quickly became her biggest hit to date.

Music video
The music video was directed by Luis de Velasco and premiered in October 1996. In the video Fey is drawing a guy in a room while it's raining, then she is dancing down the rain and is singing the song, the video ends with Fey standing in the floor down the rain then appears a message in a black found that says: "La magia existe apesar de la realidad no temas verla" in English is "Despite reality, magic exists. Don't be afraid to see it".

Chart performance
After the album was released in early November 1996. In the U.S., the song appeared on the Billboard Hot Latin Tracks chart for over 40 weeks, peaking at number 8.

Weekly charts

See also
List of Billboard Latin Pop Airplay number ones of 1997

References

1996 singles
Fey (singer) songs
1996 songs